Lataste's gerbil (Gerbillus latastei) is distributed mainly in Tunisia, Libya, and possibly Algeria.  It is also known as the hairy-footed gerbil.

References

Gerbillus
Rodents of North Africa
Mammals described in 1903
Taxa named by Oldfield Thomas